The Brazilian Mathematical Olympiad (also known as OBM) is a mathematics competition held every year for students of Brazil. The participants are awarded gold, silver and bronze medals in accordance with their performance. The main purpose of this competition is to help in selecting students to represent Brazil at the International Mathematical Olympiad.

History 
The Brazilian Mathematical Olympiad has been held since 1979. On that occasion, 11 students were awarded in 1st, 2nd, and 3rd places, and 15 were awarded in the other categories.

In 1991, the competition started to have two levels: Junior, for students with a maximum of 15 years; and Senior, for high school students. Over the years, there have been changes, such as the creation, in 2001, of the University level, with two phases.

In 2017, OBM was integrated into OBMEP. It is then carried out in a single phase, for levels 1, 2, and 3, only for invited students, considering, among other criteria, the score obtained in the second phase of the OBMEP. The University level is maintained, in two phases, but it counts on the individual registration of the undergraduate student.

Goals 

 Decisively interfere in the improvement of Mathematics teaching in Brazil, improving students and teachers through participation in the Olympics.
 Discover young people with exceptional mathematical talent and put them in contact with professional mathematicians and high-level research institutions, providing favorable conditions for the formation and development of a research career.
 Select and train students who will represent Brazil in international Mathematics Olympiads, based on their performance at OBM.
 Support regional mathematics competitions throughout Brazil.
 Organize international mathematics competitions based in Brazil.

Participation levels 
The exams are subdivided into four levels, according to the student's education level.
 Level 1: Middle school student from 6th or 7th year (grade level)
 Level 2: Middle school student from 8th or 9th year or any student who finished Middle school less than one year and has not yet been admitted into the High school
 Level 3: High school student from any year (1st, 2nd, or 3rd)
 University: Higher education student from any course or any student who finished High school less than one year and has not yet gotten into the university

External links 
 Official site

See also 
 Olimpíada Brasileira de Matemática das Escolas Públicas

Mathematics competitions